General Fane may refer to:

Henry Fane (British Army officer) (1778–1840), British Indian Army general
Mildmay Fane (British Army officer) (1795–1868), British Army general
Vere Bonamy Fane (1863–1924), British Indian Army major general
Walter Fane (1828–1885), British Indian Army major general
John Fane, 11th Earl of Westmorland (1784–1859), British Army general
John Fane, 7th Earl of Westmorland (1685–1762), British Army general